V4 or V-4 may refer to:

Science and technology
 LNER Class V4, a class of British steam locomotives
 V4 engine, a V engine with four cylinders in two banks of two cylinders
 Visual area V4, in the visual cortex
 Klein four-group, in mathematics
 V.4, an ITU-T recommendation for data transmission
 ATC code V04 Diagnostic agents, a subgroup of the Anatomical Therapeutic Chemical Classification System
 The V4 JavaScript engine for QML
 V4, one of six precordial leads in electrocardiography

Other uses
 Visegrád Group, an alliance of four Central European states - Czech Republic, Hungary, Poland and Slovakia
 Rheinbote or V-4, a German World War II four-stage missile
 Saint Kitts & Nevis (ITU prefix)
 Vieques Air Link (IATA airline code)
 V4, a grade (climbing) for difficulty of a boulder climbing route

See also
4V (disambiguation)